Scissor grinder may refer to:

 Scissor grinder, an antiquated term for a sharpener, or grinder, of scissors; see knife sharpening and grinding (abrasive cutting)
 Scissor grinder cicada, a common name for certain species of Neotibicen, a genus of cicadas, in reference to the sound of their mating calls:
 Neotibicen pruinosus, or "Scissor grinder"
 Neotibicen latifasciatus, or "Coastal scissor grinder"
 Neotibicen winnemanna, or "Eastern scissor grinder"

Animal common name disambiguation pages